Holsman may refer to:

People 
Hans Holsman (1610 – 1652), a German Baroque painter
Henry K. Holsman (1866–1963), American architect and car manufacturer
Jason Holsman (born 1976), American politician

Other 
Holsman Automobile Company, early American high wheeler automobile